Vokesimurex messorius, common name the Mesorius murex, is a species of sea snail, a marine gastropod mollusk in the family Muricidae, the murex snails or rock snails.

Description
The size of the shell varies between 48 mm and 90 mm.

Distribution
This species occurs in the Caribbean Sea off Honduras to Suriname, 
and off St Lucia and Saint Vincent (Antilles).

References

 Houart R. (2014). Living Muricidae of the world. Muricinae. Murex, Promurex, Haustellum, Bolinus, Vokesimurex and Siratus. Harxheim: ConchBooks. 197 pp.

External links
 

Gastropods described in 1841
Vokesimurex